The following is a list of illegal arms dealers – individuals involved in the illicit sale and transfer of firearms.

People convicted of arms trafficking
Arms dealers
Lists of criminals